Sergei Aleksandrovich Vylezhanin (born 2 February 1971) is a Russian football manager and a former player. He is an assistant coach with FC Novosibirsk.

Vylezhanin played in the Russian First Division with FC Chkalovets Novosibirsk.

External links
 

1971 births
Living people
Soviet footballers
Association football forwards
FC Sibir Novosibirsk players
Russian footballers
Russian football managers